Shipston-on-Stour railway station was a railway station which served the town of Shipston-on-Stour, Warwickshire. It was the terminus of the Shipston-on-Stour branch.

History
The station was originally opened in 1836 as part of the as the Moreton and Shipston Tramway, which was converted to railway use in 1889. The carrying of passengers ceased on 8 July 1929, following which the Great Western Railway instituted a bus service between Banbury and Chipping Norton that ran 8 times daily in each direction. The facility to handling freight was retained until the line closed completely in 1960, after which the track was lifted.

Present day
The wooden passenger station building was demolished sometime in the late 1970s. Portions of the platforms however remained in place and - along with the complete goods station building, livestock pens and engine shed - were utilized by a number of small businesses well into the late 1990s. However, all the buildings were eventually demolished as the site was cleared and built on by a large housing development which also built onto the track formation and goods yard. There are only sections of track bed traceable and the weigh office is now in private use.

References

 Shipston-on-Stour Station
 GWR Route: Moreton-in-Marsh to Shipston-on-Stour
 Shipston on Stour. Railway Station
 The Shipston-on-Stour Branch by Stanley C Jenkins and Roger Carpenter - Warwickshire Railways
 Shipston-on-Stour Branch
 Shipston-on-Stour Branch
 The Shipston on Stour Branch
 Rail Album - Stratford-upon-Avon & Moreton-in-Marsh Railway - Page 3

Disused railway stations in Warwickshire
Railway stations in Great Britain opened in 1836
Railway stations in Great Britain closed in 1960
Shipston-on-Stour